Elizabeth York Brunton (1880 – c.1960) was a Scottish artist known as a painter in both oils and watercolours and for her use of colour woodcuts. Although she lived in Edinburgh for most of her life, her exhibiting career was mainly overseas.

Biography
Brunton was born in Musselburgh and studied at the Edinburgh College of Art. She continued her studies in Paris as a pupil of Edouard Nevellier. Brunton often painted views of markets on the continent in both oil paint and watercolour. In Paris, she exhibited a statute at the Salon des Artistes Francais in 1925 and coloured wood engravings at the Salon d'Automne in 1929 and 1930.

Brunton became a member of the Colour Woodcut Society and had prints exhibited at the Society of Graver Printers in Colour between 1924 and 1932, and eventually became a member of that Society. Her print work featured in a number of international exhibitions, including shows in New York, Boston, Leipzig and in France, Holland and Japan. A Japanese influence can be seen in her prints of birds and animals. Although she largely exhibited her work overseas, within her native Scotland Brunton had works shown at the Royal Scottish Academy, with the Scottish Society of Women Artists and displayed some nineteen pieces with the Royal Glasgow Institute of the Fine Arts. The British Museum holds eleven examples of prints by her.

References

1880 births
1960 deaths
20th-century British printmakers
20th-century Scottish painters
20th-century Scottish women artists
Alumni of the Edinburgh College of Art
Artists from Edinburgh
People from Musselburgh
Scottish wood engravers
Scottish women painters
Women engravers
20th-century engravers